Nightingall is a surname. Notable people with the surname include:

Ken Nightingall (1928–2020), British sound engineer
Miles Nightingall (1768–1829), British Army officer
Walter Nightingall (1895–1968), British racehorse trainer